Assy (Ası) is a rural locality (a selo) and the administrative centre of Assinsky Selsoviet, Beloretsky District, Bashkortostan, Russia. The population was 818 as of 2010. There are 9 streets.

Geography 
Assy is located 117 km northwest of Beloretsk (the district's administrative centre) by road. Brish is the nearest rural locality.

References 

Rural localities in Beloretsky District